The Verner VM 133 is a family of Czech two cylinder, horizontally opposed, four stroke aircraft engines, designed and built by Verner Motor of Šumperk.

Design and development
The 133M is based on the earlier Verner 1400 and uses a 12 volt 1000W electric starter and has a 12 volt 160W generator. It runs on 95 octane automobile fuel or 100LL Avgas. The recommended time between overhauls is 1000 hours.

The engine was still advertised for sale on the company website in 2013, but by 2015 was no longer listed as available and it is likely that production has ended.

Variants
VM 133M
Original model
VM 133MK
Improved model

Applications
Airflow Twinbee
Airkraft Sunny
Aquilair Swing
Avid Catalina
Flitzer Z-21
Rainbow Cheetah
SlipStream Genesis

Specifications (VM133 MK)

See also

References

External links

Photo of the VM 133

Verner aircraft engines
1990s aircraft piston engines
Boxer engines